Fredrik Hammar (born 26 February 2001) is a Swedish professional footballer who plays as a central midfielder for Allsvenskan club Hammarby IF.

Hammar is a product of the IF Brommapojkarna academy, Hammar began his senior career in earnest with Akropolis IF, whom he joined in 2018. Two years with Brentford B in England yielded just one first team appearance, before his return to Akropolis IF in 2021. Hammar joined Hammarby IF's feeder club Hammarby TFF in 2022 and played concurrently for both clubs during the 2022 season, before graduating to the parent club. Hammar won 29 caps and scored four goals for Sweden at youth level.

Club career

IF Brommapojkarna 
A holding midfielder, Hammar began his career in the academy at IF Brommapojkarna and received his maiden call into the first team squad for a Superettan match versus Åtvidabergs FF on 23 September 2017. With the match safe at 3–1, he made his senior debut as an injury time substitute for Jacob Ortmark. It proved to be Hammar's only senior appearance for the club and he departed the Grimsta IP in August 2018.

Akropolis IF 
On 11 August 2018, Hammar dropped down to Division 1 to join Akropolis IF on an 18-month contract. During the remainder of the 2018 season, he made 13 appearances and scored four goals, before leaving the club in January 2019.

Brentford 
On 29 January 2019, Hammar moved to England to join the B team at Championship club Brentford on an 18-month contract, with the option for a further year. He scored one of the goals in Brentford B's 4–0 2019 Middlesex Senior Cup Final victory over Harrow Borough and finished the 2018–19 season with 16 appearances and two goals. Hammar was a part of the first team squad throughout much of the 2019–20 pre-season and after recovering from injury, he made his debut as a late substitute for Jan Žambůrek in a 1–0 FA Cup third round victory over Stoke City on 4 January 2020. Hammar was promoted into the first team group for the 2019–20 season restart and the club took up the one-year option on his contract in July 2020.

Hammar was included in the first team group for the duration of the 2020–21 pre-season. Having failed to make a first team appearance so far during the 2020–21 regular season and with six months left on his contract, Hammar departed Brentford on 25 January 2021. During two years with the B team, Hammar made 51 appearances and scored seven goals.

Return to Akropolis IF 
On 25 January 2021, Hammar signed a one-year contract with former club Akropolis IF for an undisclosed fee. He made 30 appearances during a 2021 season which ended in relegation from Superettan through the relegation play-offs. Hammar signed a one-year contract extension in July 2021, but elected to depart the club in January 2022. Across his two spells with Akropolis IF, Hammar made 43 appearances and scored four goals.

Hammarby IF 
On 29 January 2022, Hammar transferred to Ettan club Hammarby TFF. Having joined Hammarby IF's feeder club, Hammar was included in the parent club's first team group for its pre-season training camp in Marbella. During the 2022 season, he made 26 appearances and scored seven goals for Hammarby TFF, in addition to two appearances for Hammarby IF. On 10 August 2022, Hammar signed a -year contract with Hammarby IF and he was included in the squad for its post-season training camp in Marbella.

International career 
Hammar has been capped by U17 and U19 level. He was a part of Sweden's 2018 UEFA European U17 Championship squad and scored two goals in three appearances at the tournament.

Personal life 
Hammar grew up in Hässelby and also played floorball and ice hockey before deciding to concentrate on football. He is a Hammarby IF supporter.

Career statistics

Honours 
Brentford B

 Middlesex Senior Cup: 2018–19

References

External links

Fredrik Hammar at svenskfotboll.se

2001 births
Living people
Swedish footballers
Association football midfielders
Sweden youth international footballers
Brentford F.C. players
IF Brommapojkarna players
Akropolis IF players
Hammarby Talang FF players
Swedish expatriate footballers
Swedish expatriates in England
Expatriate footballers in England
Superettan players
Ettan Fotboll players
Hammarby Fotboll players
Allsvenskan players